Betty Sue Hearnes (née Cooper; born July 24, 1927) is a Democratic American politician from Missouri.

She married Warren E. Hearnes, a recent West Point graduate, on July 2, 1948, while he was on leave from the United States Army, and was his partner throughout his career, including his two terms as Governor of Missouri and the federal investigations of his conduct by the Nixon White House, until his death in August 2009.

She was elected to the Missouri House of Representatives from Charleston in 1979, in a special election. She was re-elected in 1980, 1982, 1984, and 1986.

In 1988 she was the Democratic nominee for governor and lost to John Ashcroft. Ashcroft received 64 percent of the vote in the general election—the largest landslide for Missouri governor since the Civil War. She lost bids to return to the state house in 1990, the Missouri State Senate in 1992 and the state house in 1998.

In 2005, both Warren and Betty Hearnes were awarded the Edwin P. Hubble Medal of Initiative during the Charleston Dogwood-Azalea Festival. The medal was presented by a delegation of citizens from Marshfield, Missouri. The medal is the city of Marshfield's highest honor and is named for a native son.

References

|-

1927 births
Baylor University alumni
First Ladies and Gentlemen of Missouri
Living people
Democratic Party members of the Missouri House of Representatives
People from Brinkley, Arkansas
People from Charleston, Missouri
Southeast Missouri State University alumni
University of Missouri alumni
Women state legislators in Missouri
21st-century American women